SS Frederick Bartholdi was a Liberty ship built in the United States during World War II. She was named after Frédéric Bartholdi, French sculptor who is best known for designing Liberty Enlightening the World, commonly known as the Statue of Liberty.

Construction
Frederick Bartholdi was laid down on 29 August 1943, under a Maritime Commission (MARCOM) contract, MC hull 1503, by J.A. Jones Construction, Brunswick, Georgia; sponsored by Mrs. O.H. Hall, and launched on 9 November 1943.

History
She was allocated to the West India Steamship Company, on 11 November 1943. On 24 December 1943, she ran aground off Skye, Scotland,  while on passage from Jacksonville to London, with a general cargo. By the time a dive survey was undertaken, 10 weeks later, her hull had split, with the fore part of the ship being only connected to the stern by the deck plating. She was declared a constructive total loss (CTL), but as her cargo could not be safely unloaded in situ, so she was refloated using a new type of flexible rubber patches and beached in Uig Bay, on 22 June 1944, where her cargo was salvaged. She was subsequently towed to the River Clyde, and scrapped in September 1944, at Kames Bay.

References

Bibliography

 
 
 
 
 
 
 

 

Liberty ships
Ships built in Brunswick, Georgia
1943 ships
Maritime incidents in December 1943